Carol Vinson is an Australian soccer player and former captain of the Australia women's national soccer team. Vinson played 13 times for Australia from 1988 to 1991 and scored 12 goals. In 1990 she played club football in Denmark for Fortuna Hjørring.

References

Year of birth missing (living people)
Living people
Fortuna Hjørring players
Expatriate women's footballers in Denmark
Australian expatriate sportspeople in Denmark
Women's association football forwards
Australia women's international soccer players
Sportswomen from New South Wales
Soccer players from New South Wales
Australian women's soccer players